Bethany Antonia (born 25 December 1997) is an English actress. She made her television debut with in the BBC One medical drama Doctors, and her film debut in the BFI indie Pin Cushion (2017). On television, she is known for her roles in the BBC iPlayer teen series Get Even (2020), the Netflix crime drama Stay Close (2021), and the HBO fantasy series House of the Dragon (2022–).

Early life
Born in Quinton, Birmingham, Antonia is of mixed English and Jamaican descent. When she was six, her family moved to a small coastal town in the southwestern Charente-Maritime region of France, before returning to Birmingham when she was eleven. She attended Perryfields High School and then Birmingham Ormiston Academy for sixth form, where she studied musical theatre.

At 14, she began training at First Act Workshop. She also spent many years training with Adage Dance studio in Selly Oak, Spotlight Stage School in Solihull, and with the British Youth Music Theatre.

Career 
Antonia began her career aged 14, appearing in the Shakespeare Birthplace Trust short film adaptation of The Tempest following local open auditions. She secured her first agent shortly after.

Shortly after completing her A-levels, Antonia made her television debut at the age of eighteen with a guest appearance as Jade Okonjo in a 2016 episode of the BBC One medical soap opera Doctors. She then made her feature film debut in Pin Cushion.

In 2019, Antonia was cast as Margot Rivers in the 2020 BBC iPlayer and Netflix teen series Get Even, an adaptation by Holly Phillips of the book series Don't Get Mad by Gretchen McNeil. In 2021, Antonia played Kayleigh Shaw in the eight-episode Netflix crime drama Stay Close, part of a collaboration between Red Production Company and Harlan Coben.

In January 2022, she made her professional stage debut in LAVA at Soho Theatre. As of 2022, Antonia plays Lady Baela Targaryen in the HBO fantasy series House of the Dragon, a Game of Thrones prequel and adaptation of George R. R. Martin's fictional history book Fire and Blood.

In 2023, Antonia will appear as Poppy Ngnomo in Russell T Davies' ITV miniseries Nolly, starring Helena Bonham Carter.

Filmography

Film

Television

Stage

References

External links
 
 Bethany Antonia at Spotlight

Living people
1997 births
Actresses from Birmingham, West Midlands
Black British actresses
English people of Jamaican descent
21st-century English actresses
English film actresses
English stage actresses
English television actresses